The Sony α6300 (model ILCE-6300) is a mirrorless digital camera announced on 3 February 2016. The α6300 features a 24 megapixel Exmor sensor with 425 phase detection autofocus points. The camera is powered by Sony's Bionz X image processor with an ISO range up to 51,200. Additionally, the α6300 can shoot images at up to 11 frames per second with continuous autofocus and exposure tracking.

Lens compatibility

Sony E-mount lenses, both full-frame (FE) and APS-C (E) are compatible with the α6300.

Battery life
Model α6300 comes with a capacity of 400 shots compared to its predecessor's (α6000) battery life of 360 shots.

Mobile phone application
There is an application (Image Edge Mobile) which allows a user to control the Sony A6000-A6500 camera. The application also allows a user to transfer photos over wireless to the user's mobile phone.

See also
Sony α6000
Sony α6500
Sony α7R II

References

α6300
Live-preview digital cameras
Cameras introduced in 2016